Saudi–Rashidi War of 1903–1907, also referred as the First Saudi–Rashidi War or the Battles over Qasim, was a conflict between Saudi loyalist forces of the newborn Emirate of Riyadh and the Emirate of Ha'il (Jabal Shammar), supported by the Rashidis. The pro-Ottoman Rashidis were supported by 8 battalions of Ottoman infantry. The majority of the war was fought out in a series of sporadic battles, which ended with a Saudi takeover of the al-Qassim region following their decisive victory at Qassim on April 13, 1906, though additional engagements followed in 1907.

Casualties 
Saudi–Rashidi War (combined 2,607+ casualties):
 Battle of Unaizah (1904) - 372 killed.
 Battle of Buraidah - unknown.
 Battle of Bekeriyah (1904) - 2,200 killed.
 Battle of Shinanah (1904) - unknown.
 Battle of Rawdat Muhanna (1906) - 35+ killed.
 Battle of Tarafiyah (1907) - unknown.

References

Ottoman Arabia
1903 in Saudi Arabia
1904 in Saudi Arabia
1905 in Saudi Arabia
1906 in Saudi Arabia
1907 in Saudi Arabia
Wars involving the Ottoman Empire
Conflicts in 1903
Conflicts in 1904
Conflicts in 1905
Conflicts in 1906
Conflicts in 1907
Ibn Saud